Charlie Trairat Potjes (born January 19, 1993) also known as Nak, is a Thai actor and singer. He gained stardom through Fan Chan, which was Thailand's highest-grossing film in 2003.

Early life
Potjes was born in Bangkok to a Dutch father and a Thai mother. He is the youngest child of 6 siblings.

Career
Potjes started his movie career before he was 2-years-old in the movie Once Upon A Time directed by Thai classic director Bhandit Rittakol. He became well known after his co-starring role in Fan Chan (My Girl), the Thai No.1 Box Office in year 2003. He also starred in other top Thai flicks like Dek hor and Phobia 2. Now he is performing various roles in Thai entertainment such as the actor, VJ and model. His latest project is co-starring in Thai drama Rak Mai Me Wan Tai which will be broadcast on Ch.3.

In 2015, Potjes released 2 music video on his official YouTube account.

Filmography

Film
 Once Upon a Time (Kalla khrung nueng... muea chao nee) (1995)
 Fan Chan (My Girl) (2003)
 The King Maker (2005)
 Dorm (Dek hor) (2006)
 Legend of Sudsakorn (2006)
 Hormones (Pidtermyai huajai wawoon) (2008)
 Phobia 2 (2009)
 Donut โด๋นัท (2011)
 Arbat (2015) 
 Buppha Arigato / I Can See Ghost (2016)
 Check In Shock (2020)
 The 100 (2022)

Television 
 Khru Wai Jai Rai on Ch.3 (2005)
 The Gang – Ponlapak Rak Pandin on Ch.5 (2008–2009)
 Puen Sa Tewada Jiew on Ch.7 (2009)
 The Sin Chronicles – Bantuek Karma on Ch.3 (2009–2010)
 Rak Mai Mee Wan Tai on Ch.3 (shooting / 2010) (2011)

Hosting 
 VJ in Kon Doo Pen Yai on Channel V Thailand (2008)

Discography
Singles
 2018: Sud Tai
 2018: Kon Lew Lew

Awards 
 Surasawadi Awards (Golden Doll Awards) for 'Best Actor' from Dek hor in 2006
 Casting Board talent in 'Star Summit Asia,' Pusan Film Festival 2006

References

External links 

 

Charlie Trairat
1993 births
Living people
Charlie Trairat
Charlie Trairat
Charlie Trairat
Charlie Trairat
Charlie Trairat
Charlie Trairat